Oxirene is a heterocyclic chemical compound which contains an unsaturated three-membered ring containing two carbon atoms and one oxygen atom. The molecule was synthesized in low temperature ices and detected upon sublimation by isomer selective photoionization reflectron time-of-flight mass spectrometry. 

Quantum chemical computational techniques found the configuration to be extremely strained and proposed an antiaromatic 4π electron system, as such oxirene is expected to be very high energy.  

Experimental indications exist that substituted oxirenes (as intermediates or transition states) may be involved in carbonylcarbene rearrangements observed in the Wolff rearrangement. Computational evidence also point to the intermediacy of oxirenes in the ozonolysis of alkynes.

References

Oxygen heterocycles
Ethers
Hypothetical chemical compounds
Three-membered rings
Antiaromatic compounds